Penhelig railway station serves the eastern outskirts of the seaside resort of Aberdyfi in Gwynedd, Wales. It was opened by the Great Western Railway in 1933.

Its situation is unusual, being located on a short length of sharply curved single track between two tunnels. The station is an unstaffed halt on the Cambrian Coast Railway with passenger services to Tywyn, Barmouth, Harlech, Porthmadog, Pwllheli, Machynlleth and Shrewsbury. Trains stop on request.

2018 reconstruction
Between 1 January and 30 March 2018, the station was closed as Network Rail replaced the previous timber platform with an improved structure coated with glass reinforced plastic. This is intended to reduce the need for maintenance work. The station lighting was also improved with the addition of a dot matrix display for train departures, as well as improvements on the tunnels either side of the station. During the closure, Arriva Trains Wales provided a taxi service to those wishing to use the station.

Facilities

There are no ticketing facilities at the station, and it is unstaffed. The station features a traditional GWR pagoda shelter, which includes original wooden seating, and provides good shelter from the weather. The shelter was restored to its former glory during the station's reconstruction in 2018 featuring a fresh coat of paint, new flooring, windows and roof. There is no help point or toilets. There is also no car park, but a bus shelter is located outside the station, on the opposite side of the road.

Gallery

References

External links

Railway stations in Gwynedd
DfT Category F2 stations
Former Great Western Railway stations
Railway stations in Great Britain opened in 1933
Railway stations served by Transport for Wales Rail
Railway request stops in Great Britain
Aberdyfi